Trianthema is a genus of flowering plants in the ice plant family, Aizoaceae. Members of the genus are annuals or perennials generally characterized by fleshy, opposite, unequal, smooth-margined leaves, a prostrate growth form, flowers with five perianth segments subtended by a pair of bracts, and a fruit with a winged lid. The genus contains about 30 described species growing in tropical and subtropical regions, especially Australia. One common species, Trianthema portulacastrum, desert horse purslane, is frequent as a weed in agricultural areas and is widely distributed.

Taxonomy
The genus Trianthema was first formally described in 1753 by Carl Linnaeus in Species Plantarum.

Species list
The following is a list of species of Trianthema according to Plants of the World Online as at October 2020:
 Trianthema argentinum Hunz. & A.A.Cocucci (Argentina)
 Trianthema ceratosepalum Volkens & Irmsch. (Kenya, Somalia, Tanzania)
 Trianthema clavatum (J.M.Black) H.E.K.Hartmann & Liede (South Australia)
 Trianthema compactum C.T.White (Queensland, Northern Territory))
 Trianthema corallicola H.E.K.Hartmann & Liede (Kenya, Somalia)
 Trianthema corymbosum (E.Mey. ex Sond.) H.E.K.Hartmann & Liede (South Africa)
 Trianthema crystallinum (Forssk.) Vahl (Bangladesh, Myanmar, Africa, Yemen, South Africa)
 Trianthema cussackianum F.Muell. (Western Australia)
 Trianthema cypseleoides (Fenzl) Benth. (New South Wales)
 Trianthema glossostigma F.Muell. (Northern Territory, Western Australia)
 Trianthema hecatandrum Wingf. & M.F.Newman (Venezuela)
 Trianthema hereroense Schinz (Namibia)
 Trianthema kimberleyi Bittrich & K.M.Jenssen (Western Australia)
 Trianthema megaspermum A.M.Prescott (Northern Territory)
 Trianthema mozambiquense H.E.K.Hartmann & Liede (Mozambique)
 Trianthema oxycalyptrum F.Muell. (Northern Territory, Western Australia)
 Trianthema pakistanense H.E.K.Hartmann & Liede (India, Pakistan)
 Trianthema parvifolium E.Mey. ex Sond. (Angola, Botswana, Cape Provinces, Free State, Namibia, Northern Provinces)
 Trianthema patellitectum A.M.Prescott (Northern Territory, Western Australia)
 Trianthema pilosum F.Muell. (Australia)
 Trianthema portulacastrum L. – Desert horse purslane (many continents)
 Trianthema rhynchocalyptrum F.Muell. (Northern Territory, Queensland)
 Trianthema salsoloides Fenzl ex Oliv. (Angola, Botswana, Cape Provinces, Free State, Kenya, Mozambique, Namibia, Northern Provinces, Sudan, Tanzania))
 Trianthema sanguineum Volkens & Irmsch. (Kenya, Tanzania)
 Trianthema sheilae A.G.Mill. & J.Nyberg (Eritea, Ethiopia, Saudi Arabia, Sudan, Yemen)
 Trianthema triquetrum Willd. ex Spreng. (Sahara to Sahel to South Africa, Indian subcontinent, to Thailand, North-east Jawa to Lesser Sunda Island, Australia)
 Trianthema turgidifolium F.Muell. (Northern Territory, Western Australia)
 Trianthema ufoense H.E.K.Hartmann & Liede (Northern Territory, Queensland, South Australia)
 Trianthema vleiense H.E.K.Hartmann & Liede (Cape Provinces, Free State, Northern Provinces)

References

External links

Jepson Manual Treatment

 
Aizoaceae genera
Taxa named by Carl Linnaeus